The Armed Proletarian Cells (abbreviated NAP) was far-left terrorist group active in Southern Italy, from 1974 to 1977, during the so-called "Years of Lead". NAP was responsible for numerous terrorist acts.

Organization
In contrary to the Red Brigades, NAP was structured "horizontally", with independently constituted cells. 

Incarcerated members of NAP were looking for new members and supporters among criminal prisoners, defining them as "sub-proletarian class".

See also
 Communist terrorism
 Red Brigades
 Prima Linea
 Armed Proletarians for Communism

References

1974 establishments in Italy
1977 disestablishments in Italy
Clandestine groups
Communist organisations in Italy
Communist terrorism
Defunct communist militant groups
Factions of the Years of Lead (Italy)
Left-wing militant groups in Italy
Organizations disestablished in 1977
Organizations established in 1974
Terrorism in Italy
Defunct organisations designated as terrorist in Italy